The Hit List (aka Hit List or YTV's Hit List) was a music video television program that aired on YTV, a Canadian specialty television network aimed at children. The series first started in 1991, hosted by Tarzan Dan and had 14 seasons in all. The first 6 seasons of The Hit List were hosted by "Tarzan" Dan Freeman, while there were numerous hosts to follow from Aashna Patel, Leslie Bosacki and Exan Auyoung to Rob Fournier and Danielle McGimsie. As of fall 2005, The Hit List went on an indefinite hiatus. On the air, it was claimed it was due to the increase in more mature music videos that they are unable to show, naming I'm a Slave 4 U, Cry Me a River (Justin Timberlake song) and Dirrty as examples. The show was later cancelled.

At The Hit List'''s peak, two compilation CDs were released by YTV and MCA in 1994 and 1996, each featuring pop, R&B, rap, and dance songs aired on the show's countdown. The later Big Fun Party Mix compilation album series, which debuted in 2000 through Universal, can be seen as a spiritual successor to the Hit List'' CDs.

The celebrities include "Weird Al" Yankovic, Backstreet Boys, Christina Aguilera, *NSYNC, Take That, The Smashing Pumpkins, Spice Girls, Five, No Doubt, Britney Spears, Blur, Kim Stockwood, The Moffatts, Hanson, O-Town, Eiffel 65, Aaron Carter, Shawn Desman, Lillix, Simple Plan, Avril Lavigne, Busted, Rachel Stevens, Clay Aiken, Alanis Morissette (back when she was Alanis) and many others.

References

External links
 IMDb - YTV's Hit List
 The Hit List (ARCHIVED April 1997-February 1998)
 The Hit List (ARCHIVED April 1999-August 2002)
 The Hit List (ARCHIVED October 2002-August 2005)

1990s Canadian children's television series
2000s Canadian children's television series
1990s Canadian music television series
2000s Canadian music television series
1991 Canadian television series debuts
2005 Canadian television series endings
Canadian children's musical television series
YTV (Canadian TV channel) original programming
Television shows filmed in Toronto
Television series by GRC Productions
Television series by Corus Entertainment